Bae Jin-young (born May 10, 2000) is a South Korean singer and actor. He is a member of South Korean boy group CIX, and a former member of boy group Wanna One, after finishing tenth in the final rankings of Produce 101 season 2. Following Wanna One's disbandment, Bae Jinyoung debuted in CIX in July 2019.

Early life
Bae Jin-young was born on May 10, 2000, in Seoul, South Korea. He attended Lila Art High School.

Career

Pre-debut
Bae Jin-young was a trainee under C9 Entertainment for 10 months.

2017–2018: Produce 101 and Wanna One

Bae Jinyoung participated in the South Korean boy band survival show Produce 101 season 2, which aired by Mnet from April 7 to June 16, 2017. Bae Jinyoung quickly gained immense popularity before the show aired as his PR-video of him doing his "Baebastic" introduction went viral. Bae's infamous Aegyo-set "ttak-ttak" was first revealed in the video, and the PR-video is the first to reach 10 million views on Naver TV, and is today the most viewed PR-video out of all existing in the four seasons of Produce 101. In the final episode, Bae Jinyoung ranked at 10th place with 807,749 in-real time votes and thus earning a spot in the winning group, the project boy group Wanna One managed by YMC Entertainment. Bae officially debuted in Wanna One during Wanna One Premier Show-Con on August 7, 2017, at Gocheok Sky Dome with the EP mini-album 1×1=1 (To Be One). The venue is the largest ever used for an idol-group's debut event, with the reported number of attendees exceeding 20,000 people.

While promoting in Wanna One, Bae was critically acclaimed for his authority on stage and remarkable growth since competing in Produce 101 (season 2). Bae received 100 notable awards with Wanna One, reflecting the group's musical achievements and popularity, and endorsed for 25 different brands in various commercial films. 

In connection with Wanna One's disbandment, the group held their final concert, "Therefore", which was held across four days, starting from January 24 to the last show on January 27, 2019, at Gocheok Sky Dome in Seoul, where the group held their debut showcase. The final concert marked Bae Jinyoung's last appearance as a Wanna One member.

2019–present: Solo activities and CIX
Following the disbandment of Wanna One, C9 Entertainment announced Bae Jinyoung's 1st Asia fan-meeting tour, "IM YOUNG", on February 27. The tour took place at locations in South Korea, Philippines, Japan, Singapore, Thailand, Hong Kong and Taiwan. 

Bae Jinyoung debuted as a soloist on April 26 with his self-composed single album, Hard To Say Goodbye.

In July 2019, Bae debuted as a center, face, and lead dancer of boy group CIX, under his label agency C9 Entertainment.

On July 30, 2021, it was announced that Bae Jinyoung was selected as male lead in WHYNOT Media Original Drama User Not Found. He will play the character of Shin Yi-jun, a popular high schooler, who seems fierce on the outside but is actually delicate. It will be aired in November 2021.

In 2022, Bae made his big screen debut with the Thai-Singapore joint film The Antique Shop, which was released on June 2, 2022.

Discography

Single album

Singles

Other releases

Filmography

Film

Television show

Web series

Awards and nominations

Notes

References

External links

2000 births
Living people
Singers from Seoul
Produce 101 contestants
Swing Entertainment artists
South Korean television personalities
South Korean male idols
South Korean pop singers
South Korean dance musicians
21st-century South Korean singers
K-pop singers
Wanna One members
Reality show winners
Japanese-language singers of South Korea